Postcodes in the British Overseas Territory of Bermuda use two different formats, depending on whether they are for street addresses or PO Boxes.

Postcodes for street addresses consist of two letters and two digits, as follows:

Mr. & Mrs Householder
Upper Apt # 1 
9 Leafy Lane  
SMITH'S FL 07  
BERMUDA

Postcodes for PO Box addresses, however, consist of four letters. In the capital, Hamilton, a PO Box address would be: 
 
Mr. Boxholder
PO Box HM 2469 
HAMILTON HM GX  
BERMUDA

In Hamilton, each PO Box number range has a different postcode, while postcodes for PO Box addresses in the rest of Bermuda will always end in BX, for example:

PO Box DV 583  
Devonshire DV BX 
BERMUDA

External links
Bermuda Post Office
Bermuda Postal Codes
Universal Postal Union

Bermuda
Communications in Bermuda